Iuliu Năftănăilă (25 August 1942 – 28 August 1967) was a Romanian football midfielder.

Club career
Iuliu Năftănăilă was born on 25 August 1942 in Făgăraș, Romania and started to play football in 1959 at local club, Chimia in Divizia B. Two years later he was brought to Steagul Roșu Brașov by coach Silviu Ploeșteanu who gave him his Divizia A debut on 20 August 1961 in a 3–1 victory against Știința Cluj in which he scored two goals, having a total of 11 by the end of the season as the club finished on the 4th position. He remained at Steagul over the course of 7 seasons, the highlights of this period being another fourth place in the 1964–65 Divizia A season and the winning of the 1960–61 Balkans Cup. He made his last Divizia A appearance on 27 August 1967 in a 0–0 against Argeș Pitești, having a total of 150 matches played and 37 goals scored in the competition, also he has a total of 5 matches and one goal scored in the Inter-Cities Fairs Cup, 9 games and three goals scored in Cupa României and 11 games with three goals scored in the Balkans Cup. Iuliu Năftănăilă died at age 25 while driving his car and crashing into a tree, on the side of the Brașov – Făgăraș road.

International career
Iuliu Năftănăilă played three matches at international level for Romania, making his debut under coach Bazil Marian in a 1–1 friendly against Uruguay, which took place on 4 January 1947 in Montevideo on Estadio Gran Parque Central. His second game was also a friendly which ended with a 2–1 away victory against Greece. Năftănăilă's last appearance for the national team was in a 1–0 loss against Italy at the Euro 1968 qualifiers.

Honours
Steagul Roșu Brașov
Balkans Cup: 1960–61

References

External links
Iuliu Năftănăilă at Labtof.ro

1942 births
1967 deaths
Romanian footballers
Romania international footballers
Association football midfielders
Liga I players
Liga II players
FC Brașov (1936) players
Road incident deaths in Romania
People from Făgăraș